Kelloggsville is a hamlet  in the town of Niles, Cayuga County, New York, United States.

Notes

Hamlets in Cayuga County, New York
Hamlets in New York (state)